Hemaris galunae is a moth of the family Sphingidae. The species was first described by Ulf Eitschberger, Günter C. Müller and Vasiliy D. Kravchenko in 2005. It is known from Syria.

Some authors regard Hemaris galunae as a dry zone form of H. tityus or as an isolated eastern population of H. aksana, left stranded as North Africa dried out after the last ice age.

It is similar to H. tityus and H. radians, but with a broader marginal band on both forewing and hindwing. The abdominal tufts are almost black with few light brown or light yellow hair-like scales.

References

G
Moths of Asia
Moths of the Middle East
Moths described in 2005